Entebbe International Airport  is the only international airport in Uganda.

The headquarters of the Civil Aviation Authority of Uganda have been relocated to a new block off the airport highway (Entebbe–Kampala Expressway and Tunnel Road), but adjacent to the airport terminals.

History

The airport was opened by the British Colonial authorities. On 10 November 1951, the airport was formally reopened after its facilities had been extended. Runway 12/30 was now , in preparation for services by the de Havilland Comet. The new main terminal building of the airport was designed by Yugoslav Montenegrin architect Aleksandar Keković and built by Energoprojekt holding in 1972-1973 period.

The Old Entebbe airport is used by Uganda's military forces. It was the scene of a hostage rescue operation by Israeli Sayeret Matkal, dubbed Operation Entebbe, in 1976 after an Arab-German hijacking of Air France Flight 139 following a stopover in Athens, Greece, en route to Paris from Tel Aviv. The scene of that rescue was the old terminal, which has been demolished, except for its control tower and airport hall. According to a 2006 published report, plans were made to construct a domestic passenger terminal at the site of the old airport. The airport was partially destroyed in April 1979 when it was captured by Tanzanian forces during the Uganda–Tanzania War.

According to ThePrint in November 2021, reports in African media suggest that China could take over the airport over the default of a loan, which was denied by China's foreign ministry and Government of Uganda. Bloomberg News reported that the Ugandan government is seeking to amend a $200m loan agreement it signed with the Export-Import Bank of China in 2015, to ensure it doesn't lose control of the airport, citing a report from the Daily Monitor, an independent Ugandan daily newspaper. On December 1, 2021, the Attorney General of Uganda stated they had seen the story regarding the airport in media and that it was reportedly fake news.

Modernization plans: 2015–2033
In February 2015, the Government of South Korea, through the Korea International Cooperation Agency, gave the Government of Uganda (GOU) a grant of USh 27 billion towards modernization of the airport. In the same month, the GOU began a three phase upgrade and expansion of the airport to last from 2015 until 2035. The entire renovation budget is approximately US$586 million.

Phase I – 2015 to 2018
 Estimated cost of US$200 million, borrowed from Exim Bank of China.
 Relocation and expansion of the cargo terminal. 
 Construction of new passenger terminal building.
 Modernizing and improving existing passenger terminal building.
 Renovation and rehabilitation of "Runway 12/30" (the old runway), is expected to conclude in February 2019.

In March 2022, online and print media reported that the Chinese-built cargo center, capable of handling 100,000 metric tonnes of cargo, had begun commercial operations. This had replaced the old cargo facility with capacity of 50,000 metric tonnes, originally converted from an old aircraft hangar.

Phase II – 2019 to 2023
 Estimated cost of US$125 million, not yet sourced.
 Expected delays due to Covid-19 pandemic.
 Relocation and expansion of fuel storage facilities.

Phase III – After 2024
 Estimated cost of US$160.5 million, not yet sourced.  
 Building new multi-story car park.
 Construction of new control tower
 Strengthen and reseal current runways.

Expansion of departure and arrival lounges
In April 2016, Minister of Works John Byabagambi launched a USh 42.6 billion (US$11.4 million) project to expand the departure and arrival lounges. The work will be carried out by Seyani Brothers Limited and will be fully funded by the Civil Aviation Authority of Uganda. Construction is scheduled to commence on 1 June 2016 with completion expected in December 2017. This work is separate from the large expansion partially funded by the government of South Korea and People's Republic of China.

Facilities
Passenger facilities include a left-luggage office, banks, automated teller machines, foreign exchange bureaux, restaurants, and duty-free shops.

Airlines and destinations

Passenger

Notes:

: Brussels Airlines' inbound flights from Brussels to Entebbe make a stop in Kigali or Bujumbura. However, the airline does not have traffic rights to transport passengers solely between Kigali or Bujumbura and Entebbe.

: In addition to nonstop flights, some of KLM's inbound flights from Amsterdam to Entebbe make a stop in Kigali. However, the airline does not have traffic rights to transport passengers solely between Kigali and Entebbe.

: Turkish Airlines' inbound flights from Istanbul to Entebbe make a stop in Kigali. However, the airline does not have traffic rights to transport passengers solely between Kigali and Entebbe.

Airlines offering specialized passenger service to non-stop destinations

Cargo

Ground handling
, there were three ground-handling companies serving this airport:
 National Aviation Services Uganda (NAS Uganda), the largest of the three.
 DAS Handling Limited (Dairo Air Services Handling Limited) has acquired ACC3/RA3 European Union ground handling certification.
 Fresh Handling Limited, which handles exports of cut flowers, and agricultural products.

As of January 2020, Uganda Airlines was making arrangements to establish self ground handling services at EBB, later that year.

Passenger traffic

Since 2002, international passenger traffic at the airport has increased annually, except for 2009 when the Great Recession caused a small decline and 2014.

Controversies 
Several Ugandan local and international media reports claimed that Uganda would lose the grip on Entebbe International Airport to China for failing to repay the loan it borrowed from China. However, Ugandan officials denied allegations regarding China might take control of the airport. Exim Bank of China had imposed strict and aggressive repayment terms on a US$ 200 million loan to expand the only international airport of Uganda.

On 14 April 2021, the Sri Lankan Airlines in its official Twitter handle claimed that Sri Lankan cargo had made history by operating three successive cargo charter flights to Entebbe International Airport which is Uganda's only international airport uplifting over 102 metric tonnes of printed papers in February 2021. The information on whether what kind of printed papers were not revealed by Sri Lankan Airlines due to confidential reasons. However, the cargo carrier deleted the tweet for unknown reasons and it created doubts about the transparency of Sri Lankan Airlines and speculations arose about the transfer of "printed papers" cargo charter flights which departed to Uganda in February 2021. Sri Lankan Airlines later issued a statement clarifying that the printed material which was deported to Uganda included only the Ugandan currency notes and it further revealed that due to security reasons with bordering Kenya, Ugandan government preferred to obtain printed Ugandan shilling currency notes from a global security printer. The Biyagama branch of the De La Rue company is responsible for printing currency notes to countries including Uganda. Sri Lankan Airlines insisted that the consignment was purely commercial in nature and brought much needed foreign revenue to the airlines as well as for Sri Lanka.

Incidents
 In 1976, Air France Flight 139 from Tel Aviv to Paris via Athens (where the hijackers boarded) was hijacked and taken to Entebbe, and Israeli commandos rescued the hostages in Operation Entebbe.
 On 9 March 2009, Aerolift Ilyushin Il-76 S9-SAB crashed into Lake Victoria just after takeoff from Entebbe airport. Two of the engines caught fire on take-off and the resulting crash resulted in the deaths of all 11 people on board. The aircraft had been chartered by Dynacorp on behalf of the African Union Mission to Somalia. The accident was investigated by Uganda's Ministry of Transport, which concluded that all four engines were time-expired and that Aerolift's claim that maintenance had been performed to extend their service life or that the work had been certified could not be substantiated.

See also
 List of airports in Uganda

References

External links

 Website of The Uganda Civil Aviation Authority
 Seychelles' Alain St.Ange captures Uganda Civil Aviation Conference As of 7 December 2018.
 Overview of Uganda's Aviation Sector 2011 – 2016
 Entebbe Airport Expansion: Passenger Terminal Reaches 13%, Cargo Terminal at 24% As of 17 August 2017.
 Entebbe International Airport targeting regional status – CAA  As of 13 April 2017.
 Entebbe International Airport  19 April 2020.
 
 
 

Airports in Uganda
Airports established in 1929
1929 establishments in Uganda
Entebbe
Operation Entebbe
Wakiso District
Transport in Uganda
Chinese aid to Africa